Charles Wadsworth is a classical pianist and musical promoter from Newnan, Georgia, who graduated from the University of Georgia. Recognized for his abilities at a young age, at age 12 he started taking piano lessons from Hugh Hodgson, namesake of the University of Georgia's music school.  Wadsworth gained international renown in 1960 by originating the Midday Concerts at the Festival dei Due Mondi in Spoleto.  He also started the chamber music concert series at the Spoleto Festival USA, which he directs, performed at and hosted through 2009.

In 1969, Wadsworth performed the opening concerts at Alice Tully Hall at Lincoln Center.  He led the series for twenty seasons, commissioning new works by Pierre Boulez, Samuel Barber and Leonard Bernstein, among others. He also presented many young performers, including Kathleen Battle, Richard Goode, Yo-Yo Ma, Peter Serkin, Pinchas Zukerman and Jessye Norman.

In 1996, Wadsworth organized a concert for the 1996 Summer Olympics including Pinchas Zukerman, Itzhak Perlman, Lynn Harrell and Frederica von Stade.

He is married to Susan Wadsworth (founder of Young Concert Artists) and they have a daughter. He has a daughter and son from his first marriage.

White House performances
Wadsworth has been invited to perform at the White House for the Presidents John F. Kennedy, Richard Nixon, Gerald Ford, Jimmy Carter and Ronald Reagan.

Honors
Wadsworth has received awards from the French Government as a Chevalier in the Order of Arts and Letters, and from Italy as a Cavaliere Ufficiale in the Order of Merit.  He has also received the Handel Medallion for his contributions to the cultural life of the City of New York.

The Art Deco municipal auditorium in Newnan, Georgia was renovated and renamed the Charles Wadsworth Auditorium in his honor. He has performed there annually since 1990.

The University of West Georgia has created the Charles Wadsworth Music Scholarship in his honor. It was first established in 1990 by a citizens group from Newnan, Georgia.

Discography
 Judith Blegen and Frederica von Stade: Songs, Arias and Duets, with the Chamber Music Society of Lincoln Center, Columbia, 1975

Footnotes

External links
 The Charles Wadsworth Music Scholarship

Living people
Year of birth missing (living people)
American classical pianists
Male classical pianists
American male pianists
People from Coweta County, Georgia
University of Georgia alumni
21st-century classical pianists
21st-century American male musicians
21st-century American pianists